Barbara Atkinson (née Frajola, born c.1942) is an American former educator, medical doctor, and university administrator. From 2014 until 2019, she helped create the UNLV School of Medicine. Prior to time at UNLV, she was the executive vice chancellor for the University of Kansas Medical Center for 10 years, and the executive dean for the University of Kansas School of Medicine for 12 years. Prior to moving to Kansas, Atkinson worked in Pennsylvania.

Biography

Early years 
Atkinson was born in Minnesota. She attended College of Wooster where she graduated with a bachelor of arts and attended the Thomas Jefferson University Medical College to receive her medical degree. After earning her medical degree, she was hired at the University of Pennsylvania School of Medicine, where she served as an associate professor and director of the cytopathology laboratory from 1978 to 1987. In 1987, she left to become professor and chair for the Pathology and Laboratory Medicine department at the Medical College of Pennsylvania from 1987 to 1996 and later served as the school's dean from 1996 to 1999.

University of Kansas Medical Center 
Atkinson left Pennsylvania to become the chair for the KU Medical Center's Department of Pathology and Laboratory Medicine in 2000. Just two years later in 2002, she was named the sixth executive dean for the school of medicine, which oversees both the Kansas City and Wichita, Kansas campuses. As Executive Vice Chancellor, Atkinson made her number one priority to achieve the National Cancer Institute's comprehensive cancer center designation for KU's Cancer Center, which was designated on July 12, 2012. During her time as executive vice chancellor, she opened a new campus for the medical school in Salina, Kansas in 2011, oversaw the Medical Center's largest research operations expansion, and expanded it's Wichita campus to a four-year school. Atkinson retired on June 30, 2012, and left as the first and only woman to serve as both the executive vice chancellor and executive dean for the Medical Center.

In April 2010, US President Barack Obama appointed Atkinson to the Presidential Commission for the Study of Bioethical Issues.

From July 2009 to August 2009, Atkinson served as the interim chancellor for the University of Kansas.

University of Nevada, Las Vegas 
On May 19, 2014, the University of Nevada, Las Vegas announced Atkinson as its planning dean for the new school of medicine. She was hired to develop and form a new medical school, oversee academic planning, fundraising, and establish a community advisory committee. She helped fundraise $13.5 million in 60 days to create student scholarships. She was named the founding dean on November 10, 2015. She resigned September 1, 2019.

References

External links 
 UNLV profile
 KU Medical Center profile

College of Wooster alumni
Perelman School of Medicine at the University of Pennsylvania alumni
University of Kansas faculty
Leaders of the University of Kansas Medical Center
1942 births
Living people
American pathologists
Educators from Pennsylvania
Educators from Kansas
Educators from Nevada